G is the fourteenth studio album by King Creosote. It was released in 2001.

Track listing
Your Face
Two of a Kind
Missionary
Russian Sailor Shirts
S.E.P.
Once Was Lost
Now Who'd Believe It?
A Prairie Tale
Walk Tall
All I Ask
Once was Broken
Breaking Up...

External links
King Creosote: Music

2001 albums
King Creosote albums